Kire (Giri) is a Ramu language of Giri village in Yawar Rural LLG, Madang Province, Papua New Guinea.

Phonology
Out of all the Ramu languages, Kire has the most complex consonant phonemic inventory. The Kire consonants are:

{| 
| p || t || k
|-
| pʰ || tʰ || kʰ
|-
| ᵐp || ⁿt || ᵑk
|-
| b || d || ɡ
|-
| ᵐb || ⁿd || ᵑg
|-
| f || s || h
|-
| v || z || 
|-
| fʰ || sʰ || 
|-
|  || n || 
|-
|  || z || 
|-
| m || n || ŋ
|-
|  || r || 
|-
| ʋ || j || 
|}

Orthography 
Kire orthography:

References

Misegian languages
Languages of Madang Province